The Mitsubishi Q2M "Tai'yō" (大洋, Great Sea) design was derived from the Mitsubishi Ki-67-I Hiryū ("Peggy") heavy/torpedo bomber of the Japanese Army (and "Yasukuni" Navy's torpedo bomber version). It was ordered for design and construction in the last stages of war.

Development 

Powerful engines of 1,380 kW (1,850 hp) would have been used to drive five-blade propellers. Such an aircraft would have been managed by five or six crew. Due to technical troubles and a long development of the theoretical design, this aircraft did not advance from paper plans in last days of conflict.

Specification (Q2M)

References

Notes

Sources 

1940s Japanese anti-submarine aircraft
Q2M